Grachev/Grachyov (/) is the name of several rural localities in Russia:
Grachev, Belgorod Oblast, a khutor in Veydelevsky District of Belgorod Oblast
Grachyov, Bokovsky District, Rostov Oblast, a khutor in Grachyovskoye Rural Settlement of Bokovsky District in Rostov Oblast
Grachev, Krasnosulinsky District, Rostov Oblast, a khutor in Mikhaylovskoye Rural Settlement of Krasnosulinsky District in Rostov Oblast